Emergency Third Rail Power Trip is the debut album by American rock band Rain Parade, released in 1983. It is one of the most prominent records in the Paisley Underground movement of the 1980s.

Critical reception

In a contemporary review for The Village Voice, music critic Robert Christgau felt that the band imitates "dumb" music from the psychedelic era, specifically "the wimpy singing, wispy tunes, unsure drumming, repetitive guitar effects, and naïve world view of, oh, Kaleidoscope, Morning Glory, Aum."

However, AllMusic's Denise Sullivan would later state that the band was "clearly way ahead of their time," adding that "it would take years before sleepy music ... would catch on." As a result, the "traditional, gentle psychedelic pop" of this record "sounds no more made in the '80s than in the '60s or '90s." In his 2003 book Turn On Your Mind: Four Decades of Great Psychedelic Rock, critic Jim DeRogatis stated, "Emergency Third Rail Power Trip is not only the best album from any of the Paisley Underground bands, it ranks with the best psychedelic rock efforts from any era", with uplifting melodies offset by themes that were "dark and introspective." DeRogatis added: Songs such as "What's She Done to Your Mind," "Kaleidoscope," and "Look at Merri" showcase Piucci and the Robacks' ethereal vocals, Eddie Kalwa's precise drumming, Matt Piucci's colorful sitar, Will Glenn's violin and keyboard accents, and an intricate, chiming, but droney two-guitar attack that picks up where the Byrds left off with "Eight Miles High."

Musician and critic Scott Miller, in his 2010 book Music: What Happened?, cited "1 Hour  Ago" as one of 1983's best songs, calling the Rain Parade "core practitioners" of the Paisley Underground movement, with this album being "probably the most certifiably trippy of the branded projects."

Track listing
 "Talking in My Sleep" (Matt Piucci, David Roback) – 3:49
 "This Can't Be Today" (Steven Roback, Matt Piucci) – 4:36
 "I Look Around" (David Roback) – 3:07
 "1 Hour  Ago" (Steven Roback, David Roback) – 4:14
 "Carolyn's Song" (David Roback) – 4:05
 "What She's Done to Your Mind" (Matt Piucci, David Roback) – 2:56
 "Look at Merri" (Matt Piucci, David Roback, Steven Roback) – 6:34
 "Saturday's Asylum" (Steven Roback, Matt Piucci) – 3:45
 "Kaleidoscope" (Steven Roback) – 5:35
 "Look Both Ways" (Matt Piucci) – 3:10

Personnel
Rain Parade
 David Roback – vocals, guitar, percussion
 Matt Piucci – vocals, guitar, sitar, harmonica
 Steven Roback – vocals, bass
 Will Glenn – keyboards, violin
 Eddie Kalwa – drums

References

1983 debut albums
Rain Parade albums
Restless Records albums